Louis von Blessing (born Louis von Blessingh; April 8, 1829 – July 15, 1887) was a Prussian-born Union brevet brigadier general during the period of the American Civil War.  He received his appointment as brevet brigadier general dated to March 13, 1865.

Von Blessing was born on April 8, 1829, at Philipshagen on the Island of Rusgen, Prussia.  He received a college education and entered the Prussian Army until he was honorably discharged in 1858.  Von Blessing emigrated to America and settled in Toledo, Ohio, where he worked as a clerk at a dry good store.  After the war broke out, he became a captain in the 14th Ohio Infantry and later a captain in the 37th Ohio Infantry.  Von Blessing was soon promoted to lieutenant colonel and colonel.  He participated in nearly all of the important battles fought by the Army of the Tennessee.  He was severely wounded in Vicksburg campaign, but he recovered in time to join Sherman's March to the Sea.

After the war, Von Blessing worked in the real estate business and as a travel agent for a wine company.  He died on July 15, 1887, at Toledo, Ohio, of congestion of the brain.

References

See also

Union Army colonels
1829 births
1887 deaths
People of Ohio in the American Civil War
Prussian Army personnel